"Pilot" is the first episode of the American television situation comedy Everybody Loves Raymond. The episode was directed by Michael Lembeck and written by Philip Rosenthal. The episode aired on September 13, 1996 on CBS.

Plot

Debra is at home feeding the kids when Ray returns from a road trip. They start to discuss Debra's birthday plans before being interrupted by Marie. Debra then leaves Ray in charge of the kids as she goes to the movies with Linda.

Ray leaves with Leo to get pizza and places Marie in charge. When Debra returns home, she finds the house spotless but learns that Ray's parents were there. She starts to get angry at Ray because he didn't listen to her. This results in Debra asking Ray not to invite his parents to her birthday. Ray is reluctant, but eventually tells them that there is no party and makes up a story that Debra and he are going to Bear Mountain. On Debra's birthday, Ray's parents go to Ray's house to leave gifts for Debra, but find Debra and Ray there. Ray then explains why they can't come over every day. They accept it and ask Ray why is he so sensitive and Marie replies "because he's a writer", then they leave.

Ratings
Entertainment Weekly rated the episode as an 'A' calling it "No small feat, considering the fate of this season's other most promising pilots". TV.com rated the episode 8.5 out of 10 with 92 ratings.

Trivia 

 The pilot was actually filmed on another sitcom's sets. Ray and Marie's homes in the pilot differ from those used in the rest of the series. Also, parts of the set were from an earlier CBS sitcom, All in the Family.
 This episode has the first mention of "The Fruit of the Month Club."
 Robert begins to use his short-term catch phrase, "Everybody loves Raymond," just as in the sitcom's name.
 Leo, Ray's friend, is never seen or mentioned again in the entire series.
 The twin boys are named Gregory and Matthew (Ray Romano's actual sons' names) and in the pilot are played by the Ferreira triplets, although only two are seen at any one time. In all other episodes of the series, the twins are named Michael and Geoffrey and are played by Sullivan and Sawyer Sweeten.

References

Everybody Loves Raymond episodes
Everybody Loves Raymond
1996 American television episodes